Ahmed Saeed may refer to:
 Ahmed Saeed (actor), Maldivian film actor
 Ahmed Saeed (footballer, born 1980), Maldivian footballer
Ahmed Saeed (footballer, born 1989), Sudanese footballer
Ahmed Saeed (admiral), admiral in the Pakistan Navy

See also
 Ahmad Saeed, former chairman of Pakistan International Airlines and Zarai Taraqiati Bank Limited
 Saeed Ahmed (disambiguation)